The Germany women's national handball team is the national handball team of Germany. It is governed by the Deutscher Handball-Bund and takes part in international handball competitions.

Results
For  East Germany team record, look here.

Olympic Games

World Championship

European Championship

** Red border colour indicates that tournament was held on home soil.

Performance in other tournaments 
 Møbelringen Cup 2011 – Second place 
 Carpathian Trophy 1997 – Third place
 Carpathian Trophy 2008 – Third place
 Carpathian Trophy 2013 – Second place
 Carpathian Trophy 2015 – Third place

Team

Current squad
The squad for the 2022 European Women's Handball Championship.

Head coach: Markus Gaugisch

Coaches

Former notable players
Grit Jurack
Nadine Krause
Stefanie Melbeck
Sabine Englert
Clara Woltering
Anja Althaus
Anna Loerper
Nora Reiche
Svenja Huber
Kerstin Wohlbold
Nina Wörz
Susann Müller
Anne Müller
Katja Kramarczyk
Laura Steinbach
Isabell Klein

References

External links

IHF profile

National team
Women's national handball teams
Hand